Charles Collins may refer to:
Charles E. Collins (politician) (1929–2012), independent candidate for the president of the United States in 1996 and 2000
Charles E. Collins (American football), American football coach
Charles Collins (actor) (1904–1999), American actor
Charles Collins (painter) (c. 1680–1744), Irish painter
Charles Collins (songwriter) (1874–1923), English music hall songwriter
Charles Allston Collins (1828–1873), British Pre-Raphaelite painter
Chuck Collins (born 1959), American author on inequality
Chuck Collins (American football) (1903–1977), head coach of the North Carolina football team
Charles James Collins (1820–1864), English journalist and novelist
Charles Collins (ice hockey) (1882–1920), Canadian ice hockey player
Charles Collins (New South Wales politician) (1850–1898), member of the New South Wales Legislative Assembly
Charles Collins (Queensland politician) (1867–1936), miner, trade union organiser, and member of the Queensland Legislative Assembly
Charles Collins (British Army officer)

See also
Charlie Collins (disambiguation)